Svetoglas - The Mystery of Bulgarian Polyphony is the first Bulgarian male voice formation for ancestral polyphonic music.

History 

The ensemble was founded in 2009 by Daniel Spassov and Milen E. Ivanov (Soloists in the Le Mystère des Voix Bulgares) from the idea of an evocation of polyphonic sacred music and Bulgarian folklore. The formation lists also the young folk artists Stanimir Ivanov and Viktor Tomanov.

In 2012 Svetoglas released their first musical project called "The Wheel of Life" which presents, in chronological order, Traditional music and Bulgarian Orthodox Church hymns on birth, life, death and the afterlife. The project is implemented with the support of Municipality of Sofia.

Svetoglas has also realized several recordings of ancient ecclesiastical chants for the second independent project "Ancient Orthodox Hymns". In 2019, the third solo album of the quartet "Nightingale Song" is released, which includes mostly concert recordings!

Concert performances and tours
The formation has made a number of international tours as well as participated in the international Festival "Music of Faith" in Kazan, Russia, IX Slavic Forum of Arts "Golden Knight" in Stavropol Russia, the Festival of Spiritual Music in Drammen, Norway, the Festival of Sacred Music "Maestro de la Roza" in Oviedo, Spain, the International Music Festival in Cartagena, Colombia, 16 International Tolerance Festival “Murcia – three cultures”, Spain, at the International Festival for Sacred Music “Fausto Flamini” in “Saint Mary Aracoeli” Basilica in Rome, Italy, Festival "Music of the Earth", Ceriana, Italy, Fundacion "Juan March", Madrid, Spain, Iron Church in Istanbul, Budapest Hungary, Linz Austria, and Early music festival Stockholm.

Discography
 2012 The Wheel of Life
 2016 Molenie Gospodne
 2019 Nightingale Song

References 

 The Nightingale's Song
 Vi International Festival of Sacred Singing
 London Festival of Bulgarian Culture
 Togliatti Philharmonic
 Oviedo Spain
 Pablo Álvarez Fernández for Svetoglas

External links 
 
 Interview with Bulgarian newspaper
 in Youtube
 Presentation new album "Molenie Gospodne"

Living people
World music groups
Vocal ensembles
Christian musical groups
Bulgarian folk music groups
Professional a cappella groups
Year of birth missing (living people)